Yamagami Dam is a gravity concrete & fill dam (compound) dam located in Fukuoka Prefecture in Japan. The dam is used for flood control and water supply. The catchment area of the dam is 9.1 km2. The dam impounds about 18  ha of land when full and can store 2980 thousand cubic meters of water. The construction of the dam was started on 1968 and completed in 1979.

References

Dams in Fukuoka Prefecture
1979 establishments in Japan